The Church of St. John Berchmans  is the Roman Catholic church of St Michael's College in the Brussels municipality of Etterbeek, Belgium. Founded by the Society of Jesus at the turn of the 20th century, the church is dedicated to the Belgian Jesuit St. Jan Berchmans.

History
The purpose of the church was to form the vital centre of the newly created St Michael's College. It was built in the same architectural style as the rest of the school buildings. Msg. Giovanni Tacci Porcelli, Nuncio to Belgium, laid the foundation stone of the church on 20 July 1908. Architect Joseph Prémont was inspired by the Rhenan Romanesque tradition of the Middle Ages. The church is of Rhenan Romanesque revival style and was consecrated on 9 July 1912 by the Bishop of Galle, Joseph van Reeth SJ .

Exterior
The facade, made of grey freestone and rose stone from the Gileppe, is decorated with a statue of Saint Michael the Archangel, patron saint of the college. Two Romanesque entrances on the apse's right and left side lead to an antechamber.

Interior
The church is built in a Latin Cross plan with a central nave and two aisles, cut by a small transept. The nave on three levels is divided in four spans by two times three monolithic barrelled columns of polished Labrador granite. The capitals, made of white Euville stone, are all decorated with different motifs. The choir ends in a semi-circular apse under a five-sided arch. The back of the church also forms a semi-circular apse, inspired by the style of the Romanesque churches of the region of the Rhine.

Suspended above the columns of the nave, six statues of saints of the Society of Jesus rest on pedestals with their carved initials. On the left, towards the main altar are St. Alphonsus Rodriguez, St. Francis de Geronimo, and St. Stanislas Kostka. On the right are St. Peter Claver, St. Aloysius Gonzaga, and St. Francis Borgia. The statues of St. Alphonsus Rodriguez and St. Peter Claver are by the Belgian sculptor C. Van de Cappele. The others are by another Belgian sculptor, Oscar Sinia.

In 1968, after the Second Vatican Council and the liturgical reforms which followed, several transformations of the interior arrangement were carried out. Much of the original furniture has disappeared. The main altar, made from drawings by the architect Joseph Prémont, was surmounted by a tabernacle set up in a retable decorated with statuettes of copper. The altar was presented in the Brussels International Exposition of 1910.

Stained windows
The stained glass of the lower windows was made by the workshop of Camille Ganton-Defoin, Ghent. They depict the important events of life of Jesus Christ. The stained windows of the choir came from the workshop of Stalins in Antwerp. They represent the Holy Trinity, in the centre, surrounded by the four evangelists (Matthew, Mark, Luke, John) and the Four Church Fathers (St. Gregory the Great, St. Augustine, St. Ambrose, St. Jerome) and the eight saints of the Society of Jesus.

The transept rose window on the right is dedicated to Belgium with St. Joseph, the patron saint of Belgium, surrounded by Belgian saints or saints venerated in different Belgian cities. The rose window on the left depicts the Tree of Jesse with the Virgin Mary surrounded by personages of the Old Testament.

Organ
The romantic organ of the church was built by the Belgian organ builder Jean-Emile Kerkhoff. Built between 1909 and 1910, the organ has three keyboards, a pedal board, and 36 organ stops. The organ was inaugurated on 6 April 1910 by a performance of Charles-Marie Widor.

See also
 List of Jesuit sites in Belgium
 List of churches in Brussels
 Catholic Church in Belgium
 Society of Jesus

Notes

References

External links 
 
 

Roman Catholic churches in Brussels
Etterbeek
Jesuit churches in Belgium
Roman Catholic churches completed in 1912
20th-century Roman Catholic church buildings in Belgium